Corbett Field (formerly Minot Municipal Ballpark) is a baseball park in the north central United States in Minot, North Dakota. Located east of downtown and south of the Roosevelt Park Zoo, it was designed by Minot architect Ira Rush and built between 1935 and 1937 through the Federal Emergency Relief Administration. The Minot Park Board began improvements on the ballpark in 1947, including a roof on the grandstand and field lights. It was named after local dentist Victor Corbett, the president of the park board during that time.

Natural grass for over eight decades, FieldTurf was installed in the fall of 2017. The teams' dugouts are behind home plate in the base of the grandstand, rather than along the foul lines. The orange seats that were later added to the grandstand were purchased from the old Atlanta–Fulton County Stadium in Georgia. The parking lot is located on the northeast corner of the property, along the Burdick Expressway.
 
The Minot Mallards, a team playing in the integrated Manitoba-Dakota League or Mandak League, began playing at Corbett Field in May 1950. The name "Mallards" was an entry submitted by Minot native Bonnie Rae Miller in a fan-naming contest, beating out "Kernels" and "Plainsmen". In the summer of 1950, Satchel Paige pitched three games for the Mallards. After the league folded, the Mallards continued to play at the ballpark in the 1960s for the Northern League. In 1995, a newly-revived Minot Mallards began playing at the park in the Prairie League, but the league soon folded in 1997.

Today, the Minot State Beavers, Bishop Ryan Lions, and Minot High Magicians play their games at the field in the spring. In the summer, it is the home of the Minot Metros, a youth team, and the American Legion Class A Minot Vistas. 

The Minot Hot Tots of the Northwoods League will begin playing collegiate summer baseball at Corbett Field in 2023.

References

External links
 
 
 
 

Sports venues in Minot, North Dakota
Baseball venues in North Dakota
1937 establishments in North Dakota
Sports venues completed in 1937
College baseball venues in the United States
High school baseball venues in the United States
Minor league baseball venues